Tag and Bink are the main characters in a Star Wars spoof series of comic books that parody the films. The characters were created by writer Kevin Rubio and artist Lucas Marangon. They are a pair of minor characters who deliberately or accidentally influence the events in the first and second film trilogies, whose activities explain some of the implausible events of the series. The title of their initial appearance—Tag & Bink Are Dead—is a reference to the Tom Stoppard play Rosencrantz and Guildenstern Are Dead, itself titled after a line from Hamlet.

Tag is from the planet Corellia and Bink is from Alderaan. The two first meet when they are found to have Force potential. The comics illustrate how these two Jedi in training haphazardly cause all the pivotal events in the Star Wars universe. Like other Star Wars comics of the time, Tag and Bink was published by Dark Horse Comics, the holder of the Star Wars comic licence from early 1990s. The whole Tag and Bink series was collected in the trade paperback Tag & Bink Were Here. While their original appearances were meant to be parody comics, a reworked and more grounded version of the characters was later added into the canon in a scene from the novelization of the film Solo: A Star Wars Story. The scene was filmed but deleted from the film due to pacing issues.

Appearances

Comics

Tag & Bink Are Dead
Produced in 2001, between the first two films of the Star Wars prequel trilogy, the main characters of the comic were based on the Tom Stoppard play about two minor characters in William Shakespeare's Hamlet, Rosencrantz and Guildenstern Are Dead.

Tag and Bink Are Dead (#1) 
Tag and Bink are two soldiers aboard the Rebellion flagship Tantive IV when the Star Destroyer Devastator captures it. After almost being captured, they dress up as stormtroopers and are transported to the Death Star. They try to leave by stealing TIE fighters... twice. Darth Vader realizes his need for two TIE pilots as wingmen for his fight against the Rebel starfighters attacking the space station. As the comic illustrates, it is not the Millennium Falcons fault that Vader is almost killed in the trenches of the Death Star, but due to Tag and Bink's lousy piloting.

Although the two TIE fighters they appeared to be in were destroyed, the next comic states they were in fact in the background when Vader selected two pilots, and that they stole an Imperial landing craft and escaped from the Death Star moments before it exploded.

Tag and Bink Are Dead (#2) 
The adventures of Tag and Bink continue as they venture through the events of the Star Wars original trilogy, meeting up with allies such as Lando Calrissian, and villains such as Boba Fett.

Tag & Bink II

The Return of Tag & Bink: Special Edition (#1) 
Tag and Bink eventually find themselves trapped on the second Death Star dressed as the Emperor's Royal Guards. After the confrontation between Luke Skywalker and Darth Vader, the Rebels destroy the space station, killing Tag and Bink in the process. Tag and Bink return as Force ghosts.

Tag & Bink: Episode I – Revenge of the Clone Menace (#2) 
In the April 2006 comic, Tag and Bink are shown as children, haplessly trying to become Jedi under Master Yoda's tutelage. They find Anakin Skywalker and Padmé Amidala in a restaurant, as seen in Episode II – Attack of the Clones, and later secretly give tips to Anakin on how to romance Padmé. Anakin eventually leaves Tag and Bink stranded on Naboo when he goes to Tatooine. It takes them three years (the length of the Clone Wars) to get back to the Jedi Temple, just in time to see clone troopers destroy the Jedi Order. They are confronted by Anakin, newly rechristened Darth Vader; he spares them due to their past association but warns them to abandon their Jedi training.

Future
In his Reddit AMA in January 2018, Rubio revealed that a new Tag & Bink trilogy was in development, which will be set during the sequel trilogy. The titles are Tag & Bink Awaken, Tag & Bink Got Milk and The Second and Third Last Jedi (which will delve into the backstory of Supreme Leader Snoke).

Film

Solo: A Star Wars Story
In October 2017, director Ron Howard suggested he might use the characters in the 2018 film Solo: A Star Wars Story. It was later confirmed that the film's screenwriter Jon Kasdan and first assistant director Toby Hefferman would portray Tag and Bink in the film. However, their scene got cut from the final film as it was deemed unnecessary. Supposedly, the two were supposed to appear in a scene where the two escort Han Solo from a hearing after he is kicked out of the pilot academy.

The scene was included in Chapter 6 of the film's novelization, Solo: A Star Wars Story – Expanded Edition:"Why don't you tell us what allegedly happened here?" he continued, indicating a screen that had lit up. It was flanked by two Imperial guards, Lieutenants Tag Greenley and Bink Otauna. Once upon a time, Han had attempted to befriend them, but they turned out to be such colossal screwups, Han started to avoid them before they got him or themselves killed. Still, he needed all the friends he could get. He gave them a little wave and a grin. They looked back at him wryly and said nothing.

The Force Awakens
In a Reddit AMA in October 2017, Kevin Rubio supported the fan theory stating that the two stormtroopers who back up to avoid the wrath of Kylo Ren following him discovering Rey has escaped in Star Wars: The Force Awakens are an elderly Tag and Bink.

References

Comics based on Star Wars
Dark Horse Comics titles
Male characters in comics
Star Wars comics characters
Star Wars parodies